Corneodesmosin is a protein that in humans is encoded by the CDSN gene.

This gene encodes a protein found in corneodesmosomes, which localize to the human epidermis and other cornified squamous epithelia. During maturation of the cornified layers, the protein undergoes a series of cleavages, which are thought to be required for desquamation. The gene is located in the major histocompatibility complex (MHC) class I region on chromosome 6.

See also 
 Hypertrichosis simplex of the scalp
 List of conditions caused by problems with junctional proteins

References

Further reading

Plakins